Antonio Vivarini (Antonio of Murano) (active c. 14401480) was an Italian painter of the early Renaissance-late Gothic period, who worked mostly in the  Republic of Venice. He is probably the earliest of a family of painters, which was descended from a family of glassworkers active in Murano.  The painting dynasty included his younger brother Bartolomeo and Antonio's son Alvise Vivarini.

Life
He initially trained with Andrea da Murano, and his works show the influence of Gentile da Fabriano. The earliest known date of a picture of his, an altar-piece in the Accademia is 1440; the latest, in the Vatican Museums, 1464, but he appears to have been alive in 1470.

He collaborated with his brother in law, Giovanni d'Alemagna (also known as "Joannes de Alemania"), who sometimes has been regarded as a brother (Giovanni of Murano). No trace of this painter exists of a date later than 1447. After 1447 Antonio painted either alone or in combination with his younger brother Bartolommeo in Padua. The works of Antonio are well drawn for their epoch, with a certain noticeable degree of softness, and with good flesh and other tints.  He was probably influenced by Mantegna, and worked with him in the Ovetari Chapel in 1450–51. It is sometimes difficult to assign authorship for works from the Vivarini studio.

Three of his principal paintings are the Enthroned Madonna Virgin with the Four Doctors of the Church, the Coronation of the Virgin and Saints Peter and Jerome. The first two (in which Giovanni co-operated) are in the Venetian academy, the third in the National Gallery, London.

Though Alvise developed an interest in spatial coherence and solid form towards the end of the century, the Vivarini workshop, overall, continued to embody a traditional Gothic-influential approach for much longer.

References

External links 

Italian Paintings, Venetian School, a collection catalog containing information about Vivarini and his works (see index; plates 100-101).

1480 deaths
15th-century Italian painters
Italian male painters
Painters from Venice
People from Murano